Niall is a male given name of Irish origin. The original meaning of the name is unknown, but popular modern sources have suggested that it means "champion" (derived from the Old Irish word niadh),. According to John Ryan, Professor of Early and Medieval History at University College Dublin, Niall "seems to be so ancient that its meaning was lost before records began."

Notable people with the name Niall
Medieval times
Niall of the Nine Hostages, High King of Ireland who lived in the early-to-mid 5th century AD
Niall Caille, High King of Ireland in the 9th century AD

Modern times

Niall Carolan (b. 2002), Irish Gaelic footballer 
Niall Ferguson (b. 1964), Historian and the Laurence A. Tisch Professor of History at Harvard University
Niall Horan (b. 1993), a member of the British-Irish boy band One Direction
Niall Mackenzie (b. 1961), Scottish former professional motorcycle road racer
Niall Matter (b. 1980), Canadian actor
Niall McCready, Irish Gaelic footballer
Niall McGinn (b. 1987), Northern Irish footballer
Niall Moran (b. 1998), Irish hurler
Niall O'Brien (b. 1981), Irish cricketer
Niall O'Donnell (b. 1998), Irish Gaelic footballer
Niall Quinn (b. 1966), Irish former international footballer and chairman of the English club Sunderland A.F.C.
Fictional characters

 Hunter Niall from Sweep
 Niall Brigant from The Southern Vampire Mysteries
 Niall MacDonnell from the Honorverse
 Niall Rafferty from Hollyoaks
 Niall from Xenoblade Chronicles 2
 Pedron Niall from The Wheel of Time

See also
List of Irish language given names
Neil, Nigel, probable cognates through Norse, medieval Latin and Anglo-Norman borrowings.

References

Irish-language masculine given names
English masculine given names